Crucifixion is a recently discovered early-15th-century drawing of the death of Jesus attributed to Jan van Eyck or his workshop, now in the collection of the Museum Boijmans van Beuningen.  It is variously dated to the early 1430s, implying an original van Eyck, or c. 1440, making it a pastiche by a workshop member after Jan's death. The only other known van Eyck drawing is the Study for Cardinal Niccolò Albergati if the 1437 Saint Barbara is excluded as an unfinished painting, although there are similarities between the two; especially in its perspective, the angle of the observer's point of view, and the shadings of the rock formations. The quality of draftsmanship is of the first rate, and it is perhaps the most elaborate and complex surviving drawing from the 16th century.

It is executed in gold and silver stylus, pen and brush and lead slate pencil. It is in poor condition, being covered in yellowish varnish which has damaged both the paper and drawing. The drawing is linked to the left hand panel the New York Crucifixion and Last Judgement diptych, which is generally, but not always, attributed to Jan; likely workshop members completed many passages on the right hand frame. As such this drawing is either an original preparatory study, or a workshop pastiche by an associate created for commercial sale.

It shows a mass of people gather around a crucifixion scene, with Christ's followers grieving in the foreground (though they are thinly described compared to the other figures), soldiers and spectators hanging around in the mid-ground and a portrayal of three crucified bodies in the upper-ground. Both works contain a number of similarly depicted and positions figures, share the same steep perspective, with the city of Jerusalem can be seen in the distance, though at a much lower angle here than in the finished diptych.

Notes

1430s paintings
1440s paintings
Drawings by Jan van Eyck